Aleksandr Nikolayevich Yevteyev (22 February 1953 – 27 March 2021) was a Soviet and later Russian military officer who held a number of posts in the Soviet Army, reaching the rank of general-lieutenant.

Early life and career
Yevteyev was born on 22 February 1953 in the city of Volsk, Saratov Oblast, then part of the Russian SFSR, in the Soviet Union. After serving in the lower officer ranks, he rose to command positions, initially that of a platoon, and later a regiment. He undertook further studies between 1981 and 1984 at the Malinovsky Military Armoured Forces Academy, graduating with a gold medal in the specialty of command-staff, operational-tactical combined arms.

Serving with the Group of Soviet Forces in Germany during the last years of the Cold War, Yevteyev, now with the rank of lieutenant colonel, was placed in command of the 6th Separate Guards Motor Rifle Brigade in 1989. This made him head of the garrison of Soviet troops in Berlin.  He was promoted to colonel during his time in command. On 15 September 1991 Yevteyev took command of the 10th Guards Uralsko-Lvovskaya Tank Division.

Russian Army
With the dissolution of the Soviet Union in December 1991, Yevteyev continued to serve with the successor organisation, the Russian Army. He remained in command of the 10th Guards Tank Division until 31 May 1993, before leaving to begin studying at the Military Academy of the General Staff of the Armed Forces of Russia. Yevteyev stepped down as head of the 38th Research Testing Institute in 2000.

Yevteyev then served in a number of senior positions in the headquarters of the Main Command of the Ground Forces, and in the Ministry of Defence. In 2002, he was appointed commander of the  during the Abkhaz–Georgian conflict, holding the position until 2005. In 2008, he was appointed Chief of Staff and First Deputy Chief of Armaments of the Armed Forces, before retiring in 2009.

Post-military service
In retirement Yevteyev was Deputy Governor of Tula Oblast between July 2009 and August 2011. In 2012, he became the chairman of the council of the International Public Organization "Council of Veterans of Peacekeeping Forces, Local Wars and Armed Conflicts" "Peacemaker". Yevteyev died on 27 March 2021, after a serious and prolonged illness.

He had received a number of awards and honours over his career, including the Order of Military Merit, the Order "For Service to the Homeland in the Armed Forces of the USSR" Third Class, the Medal of Zhukov, Medal "Veteran of the Armed Forces of the USSR", Medal "For Impeccable Service" First, Second and Third Classes, and the Abkhazian Order of Leon.

References

1953 births
2021 deaths
People from Volsk
Russian lieutenant generals
Soviet Army officers
Recipients of the Order of Military Merit (Russia)
Recipients of the Order "For Service to the Homeland in the Armed Forces of the USSR", 3rd class
Recipients of the Medal of Zhukov
Russian Academy of State Service alumni
Military Academy of the General Staff of the Armed Forces of Russia alumni